Spirostyliferinidae is a family of small, mainly freshwater snails, (some also occur in other habitats) that have gills and an operculum, aquatic gastropod mollusks in the superfamily Truncatelloidea

Genera
 Spirostyliferina Bandel, 2006
Genera brought into synonymy
 Hoenselaaria Moolenbeek, 2009 : synonym of Spirostyliferina Bandel, 2006

References

External links
 Layton, K. K. S.; Middelfart, P. U.; Tatarnic, N. J.; Wilson, N. G. (2019). Erecting a new family for Spirostyliferina, a truncatelloidean microgastropod, and further insights into truncatelloidean phylogeny. Zoologica Scripta

Truncatelloidea